Vargeão Dome is a meteorite crater in Santa Catarina State, Brazil, straddling the municipalities of Vargeão, Faxinal dos Guedes, and Passos Maia.

It is of Early Cretaceous age, or about 123 ± 2 Ma.

The meteorite impacted on the basaltic rocks of the Serra Geral Formation (Jurassic/Cretaceous). The crater displays several concentric rings and radial faults, and an eroded central bulge. At least four post-impact lava flows have been identified between the rim and core. The impact origin of the structure is attested by the presence of shatter cones and shocked quartz grains.

Discovery and studies 
In 1978, Brazilian geologists A. Paiva Filho, C.A.V. Andrade and L.F. Scheibe

identified an anomalous circular structure in radar images produced by the RADAMBRASIL survey, and called it the Vargeão Dome. In the early 1980s, E. Barbour Jr. and W.A.G. Correa
 studied the structure in detail, in the context of oil/gas surveys of the area, and proposed a volcanic/tectonic origin for the structure.  In 1982, Á. P. Crósta and A. Paiva Filho identified it as an impact crater.  Shocked quartz was identified by M. V. Coutinho in 1987, and the occurrence of maskelynite glass was reported by J. Hachiro and others in 1993

Conservation status 
The area around and inside the crater has been heavily farmed since the end of the 19th century; Vargeão's city hall is located inside the crater, near the southern rim.  Nevertheless, the crater is still well-preserved.  The local population is well aware of the impact origin of the structure, to the point that the town's official nickname is Meteor City.

See also 

 Vista Alegre crater

References

External links 
 Earth Impact Database

Impact craters of Brazil
Cretaceous Brazil
Cretaceous impact craters
Landforms of Santa Catarina (state)
Craters